Fluvanna (1921) was an American Thoroughbred Champion racehorse. Bred by Samuel Ross, she was purchased at the Saratoga yearling sales in the summer of 1922 by Admiral Cary Grayson who raced her under his Salubria Stable colors. Out of the mare High Pass, her sire was the two-time American Champion Older Male Horse Cudgel.

Fluvanna was trained by future U.S. Racing Hall of Fame inductee Max Hirsch. Major wins in the 1923 Demoiselle and Astoria Stakes  plus  seconds in the Flash and Futurity Stakes while competing against the best two-year-old colts in the United States earned her retrospective American Champion Two-Year-Old Filly honors.

References

1921 racehorse births
Thoroughbred family 23-b
Racehorses bred in Kentucky
Racehorses trained in the United States
American Champion racehorses